Uppidamangalam is a panchayat town in Karur district in the Indian state of Tamil Nadu.

Demographics 
According to the 2001 India census, the population is 10,039. Males constitute 50% of the population and females 50%. Uppidamangalam has an average literacy rate of 62%, higher than the national average of 59.5%: male literacy is 74%, and female literacy is 50%. In Uppidamangalam, 8% of the population is under 6 years of age.

Economy 
Uppidamangalam has Tamil Nadu's second largest cattle market. Its Sunday market attracts people from Kerala and Andhra Pradesh. Cattle breeding is a fast growing occupations in the area. Agriculture is prominent. Textiles and imports are major occupations. It is one of the fastest growing villages in the area.

Geography 

Health care 
Village Government hospital is on the outskirts of Uppidamangalam. Private clinics and a pharmacy are available. Electronics shops, pest shops and tea shops are available.

Education 
Uppidamangalam is well known for its educational institutions. It offers higher and lower secondary Government schools, Rani meyyammai, Karur saraswathi vidyalaya etc.

References

Cities and towns in Karur district